Alexander Bartz (born 13 August 1984) is a German politician of the Social Democratic Party (SPD) who has been serving as a Member of the German Bundestag from Lower Saxony since November 2022.

Political career 
Bartz was previously involved with Young Socialists in the SPD.

In the 2021 German federal election, Bartz stood in the Cloppenburg-Vechta constituency and was 25th place on the SPD state list in Lower Saxony. On 8 November 2022, he replaced Falko Mohrs, who took over a ministerial post in the Lower Saxony state government, in the Bundestag.

References

See also 

 List of members of the 20th Bundestag

1984 births
Living people
People from Vechta
21st-century German politicians
German Catholics
Members of the Bundestag for Lower Saxony
Members of the Bundestag 2021–2025
Members of the Bundestag for the Social Democratic Party of Germany